Bruce S. Grant is emeritus professor of biology at the College of William and Mary. He has a particular research interest in the peppered moth, He is a defender of the teaching of evolution and has criticized creationist Jonathan Wells, who has cited his work, as "dishonest."

Grant has a B.S. in Biology from Bloomsburg University of Pennsylvania in 1964, an M.S. in Genetics from North Carolina State University, Raleigh in 1966 and a Ph.D. in Genetics from North Carolina State University, Raleigh in 1968.

An article on his contributions in research, teaching, and mentoring was published in 2005 in Genetics.

Views
In a review of Creationism's Trojan Horse: The Wedge of Intelligent Design, Grant wrote:

Neo-creationists imitate Paley’s designed-watch metaphor and peddle it like a Hong Kong Rolex, insisting it is authentic science and not religion. But of course it is religion: the intelligence in Intelligent Design demands the existence of a supernatural force or agent, so we might as well call that agent God, for short.

Publications
 Grant, Bruce S. 2009. 'Industrial melanism'. In: Evolution: The First Four Billion Years, edited by Ruse, M. and J. Travis. The Belknap Press of Harvard University Press, Cambridge, MA. pp. 652–656.
 Noor, M.A.F., R.S. Parnell, and B.S. Grant. 2008. A Reversible Color Polyphenism in American Peppered Moth (Biston betularia cognataria) Caterpillars. PLoS ONE 3(9):e3142 doi:10.1371/journal.pone.0003142 http://www.plosone.org/article/info%3Adoi%2F10.1371%2Fjournal.pone.0003142
 Grant, Bruce S. 2005. Industrial Melanism. In: Encyclopedia of Life Sciences. John Wiley & Sons, Ltd: Chichester www.els.net [doi:10.1038/npg.els.0004150]
 Grant, Bruce. 2004. 'Intentional Deception: Intelligent Design's Wedge of Creationism'. Skeptic 11: 84-86. http://www.skeptic.com/eskeptic/archives/2004/04-06-01.html
 Grant, B. S. 2004. 'Allelic melanism in American and British peppered moths'. Journal of Heredity 95:97-102.
 Grant, Bruce. 2003. 'Industrial melanism, vignette 10.3.' In: Newman, M.C. and M.A. Unger, Fundamentals of Ecotoxicology 2e. Boca Raton: Lewis Publishers 226-228.
 Grant, B. S. and L. L. Wiseman. 2002. 'Recent history of melanism in American peppered moths.' Journal of Heredity 93:86-90.
 Grant, Bruce S. 2002. 'Sour grapes of wrath.' Science 297:940-941.  
Cook, L. M. & B. S. Grant. 2000. 'Frequency of insularia during the decline in melanics in the peppered moth Biston betularia in Britain.' Heredity 85: 580-585.
 Grant, Bruce S. and Cyril A. Clarke, 1999.  'An examination of intraseasonal variation in the incidence of melanism in peppered moths, Biston betularia (Geometridae).'  Journal of the Lepidopterists' Society 53: 99-103.
 Grant, Bruce S. 1999. 'Fine tuning the peppered moth paradigm.' Evolution 53: 980-984.
 Grant, B. S., A. D. Cook, C. A. Clarke, and D. F. Owen. 1998. 'Geographic and temporal variation in the incidence of melanism in peppered moth populations in America and Britain.' Journal of Heredity 89: 465-471.
 Grant, B. S., D. F. Owen, and C. A. Clarke. 1996. 'Parallel rise and fall of melanic peppered moths in America and Britain.' Journal of Heredity 87: 351-357.
 Grant, Bruce, Denis F. Owen and Cyril A. Clarke. 1995. Decline of melanic moths. Nature 373: 565. 
 Asami, Takahiro and Bruce Grant. 1995. 'Melanism has not evolved in Japanese Biston betularia (Geometridae).' Journal of the Lepidopterists' Society 49: 88-91.
 Clarke, Cyril A., Bruce Grant, Frieda M.M. Clarke and Takahiro Asami, 1994. 'A long term assessment of Biston betularia (L.) in one UK locality (Caldy Common near West Kirby, Wirral), 1959-1993, and glimpses elsewhere.' Linnean 10: 18-26.
 Clarke, Cyril A., Frieda M.M. Clarke and Bruce Grant, 1993. 'Biston betularia (Geometridae), the peppered moth, in Wirral, England: an experiment in assembling.' Journal of the Lepidopterists' Society 47: 17-21.
 Grant, Bruce and Rory J. Howlett. 1988. 'Background selection by the peppered moth (Biston betularia Linn.): individual differences.' Biological Journal of the Linnean Society 33: 217-232.

References

External links 
 Official page

Bloomsburg University of Pennsylvania alumni
College of William & Mary faculty
Evolutionary biologists
Living people
Year of birth missing (living people)